Anatoliy Ivanovych Butenko (23 February 1938 – 4 January 2021) was a Ukrainian politician who served as a Deputy from 1990 to 1994.

References

1938 births
2021 deaths
People from Myrhorod
Communist Party of the Soviet Union members
Communist Party of Ukraine politicians
First convocation members of the Verkhovna Rada
Odesa National Polytechnic University alumni
Recipients of the Order of the Red Banner of Labour